Dawn is an American brand of dishwashing liquid owned by Procter & Gamble. Introduced in 1973, it is the best-selling brand of dishwashing liquid in the United States. Besides being used for dishwashing purposes, Dawn products are also used to remove grease from other items, such as animal fat spilled onto highways, and oil on animals, such as during the Exxon Valdez and Deepwater Horizon oil spills.

Wildlife rescue
Procter & Gamble has donated thousands of bottles of detergent to clean wildlife and has run advertisements that promote Dawn as the best product to use when cleaning animals that have been affected by oil spills. International Bird Rescue researched multiple cleaning agents, looking for one that would be "least traumatizing" and settled on a 10% solution of Dawn. The choice was the basis for Dawn's marketing and goodwill campaigns, including advertising and promotional donations tied to sales.

Outside the United States
Dawn is also sold in Canada, Australia and Mexico (with the Salvo brand also sold in the latter). From 2000 to 2002, Dawn was sold in Germany, replacing the international Fairy brand.  After sharply declining sales due to an unfamiliar brand, the Fairy brand was revived in 2002.

References

External links
 Official Dawn website

Cleaning product brands
Procter & Gamble brands
Products introduced in 1973
Soap brands